The Clinical Pharmacogenetics Implementation Consortium (CPIC) is an international consortium including members of NIH Pharmacogenomics Research Network (PGRN), PharmGKB staff, and experts in PGx and medicine, who are committed to facilitating the use of pharmacogenetic tests to improve patient care.

See also 
pharmacogenetics
pharmacogenomics
pharmacokinetics
pharmacodynamics
 PharmGKB
 Pharmacogene Variation Consortium

References

National Institutes of Health